Dame Victoire Evelyn Patricia Ridsdale, Lady Ridsdale, DBE (née Bennett; 11 October 1921 – 16 December 2009), known as Dame Paddy Ridsdale, was a British secretary and intelligence operative. She was author Ian Fleming's secretary during World War II and was the model for the character Miss Moneypenny, being M.'s loyal, long-suffering secretary, who is smitten with James Bond.

Career
She was the wife of Sir Julian Ridsdale. She served as an intelligence operative during World War II. It was later disclosed that she had assisted Fleming's counter-intelligence efforts during World War II. She was responsible for helping deceive the Axis by creating a fictitious identity for a body that had turned up drowned in Operation Mincemeat. The body was "disguise[d] as that of a naval officer, complete with totally convincing "secret" papers showing a different plan of attack ... [t]he body, appearing to be a casualty from a shot-down plane, would then be floated ashore in Spain, where local German spies would find it ... Fleming's task was to make the body totally convincing. The book covers the minute attention paid to detail, which included placing theatre tickets and love letters in 'Major Martin's' pockets Paddy Bennett is one of two probable authors of those love letters.

Personal life
She was chairwoman of the Conservative MPs' Wives club for which she was appointed a DBE in 1991, ten years after her husband's knighthood. She survived her husband, who died in 2004; they had been married since 1942 and had one daughter, Penny.

Death
Ridsdale died in 2009, aged 88.

References

External links
Sir Julian Ridsdale's obituary

1921 births
2009 deaths
Dames Commander of the Order of the British Empire
British women in World War II
Place of birth missing
Place of death missing
World War II spies for the United Kingdom
Wives of knights